The Basotho Action Party is a political party in Lesotho established on 23 April 2021 by former Justice Minister and All Basotho Convention Deputy Leader Nqosa Mahao.

In the 2022 Lesotho general election, the party won 6 seats in the National Assembly.

Election Results

References 

Political parties established in 2021
Political parties in Lesotho
2021 establishments in Africa